Doña Ana may refer to:
 Doña Ana County, New Mexico
 Doña Ana, New Mexico, a city in the above county
 Dona Ana Bridge in Mozambique

See also 
Don (honorific), for information on the titles "don" and "doña"